The Spenceville Wildlife Area is an  wildlife preserve managed by the California Department of Fish and Wildlife.  It is located in the Sierra Nevada Foothills, within Nevada County and Yuba County of northern California.

Geography

Natural history
Spenceville is a foothill oak woodland of Blue oak (Quercus douglasii) and Foothill gray pine (Pinus sabiniana), and a grassland habitat. It is notable for many species of native birds and wildflowers, including the California endemic Yellow mariposa lily (Calochortus luteus). 

The geology of the Spenceville area is part of the Smartville Block formed during the Middle Jurassic epoch 200 million years ago. The Smartville Block is a part of the California Mother Lode for gold, and consequently Spenceville has had its share of mining activity. Cleanup from copper and zinc mining continues to this day. 

The area was originally home to the Maidu and Nisenan Native Americans and evidence of their grinding holes and lodge pits still exist.

Recreation
Spenceville hosts a variety of activities: hiking, biking, hunting, hunting dog field trials, target shooting, camping, equestrian trail riding, birding, and primitive camping.  A popular trail leads to a double waterfall called Fairy Falls (a.k.a. Beale Falls, Shingle Falls, or Dry Creek Falls).   There can be a high level of rattlesnakes seasonally.

Conservation
The Spenceville Wildlife Area may be environmentally impacted by the Waldo Dam Project proposed by the Yuba County Water Agency, and by housing development proposed between Beale Air Force Base and the wildlife area.

See also
 California oak woodlands

References

External links
 California Department of Fish and Wildlife−DFW: official Spenceville Wildlife Area website
CA−DFW: Map of Spenceville Wildlife Area
 Friends of Spenceville website
Waterfallswest.com: Information on waterfalls of Spenceville

Nature reserves in California
California Department of Fish and Wildlife areas
Protected areas of Yuba County, California
Protected areas of Nevada County, California
Protected areas of the Sierra Nevada (United States)
1968 establishments in California
Protected areas established in 1968